Orson Spencer (March 14, 1802 – October 15, 1855) was a prolific writer and prominent member of the Church of Jesus Christ of Latter-day Saints. He served in several highly visible positions within the church and left an extensive legacy of theological writings.  Orson Spencer is one of the examples William Mulder cites of highly educated people becoming Mormons during the time of Joseph Smith

Early life and education
Born in West Stockbridge, Berkshire County, Massachusetts, Spencer was generally esteemed a bright boy. At age twelve he contracted a fever that nearly killed him and left him with a permanent limp.  At age fifteen, the town sheriff was so struck by him that he offered to finance Spencer's education. That same year he entered Lenox Academy.  In 1824, Spencer graduated with honors from Union College at Schenectady, New York.

In 1825 Spencer took a job as a school teacher in Washington, Wilkes County, Georgia.  While in Georgia he also began the study of law.

In 1827, Spencer joined the Baptist church and decided to become a pastor. He attended the theological college at Hamilton, New York (now known as Colgate University), and graduated as class valedictorian in 1829. Spencer served as pastor at three congregations throughout New England between 1829 and 1841.

Religious conversion
Spencer was introduced to the Church of Jesus Christ of Latter-day Saints by his brother Daniel and was baptized by the same in spring 1841, necessitating the discontinuation of Orson's Baptist ministry. During his time of investigating the faith, Spencer obtained as much information as he could about Solomon Spalding and other items that called into question the divine origin of the Book of Mormon, but he was still convinced of its truthfulness by reading it.

News of Spencer's conversion reached many of his Baptist colleagues. Reverend William Crowell sent a letter inquiring about his conversion and the Mormon faith in general. Spencer's responses to this and other epistles were published and remain of interest to many Latter-day Saints today.

Church service
Shortly after his conversion, Spencer and his family moved to Nauvoo, Illinois.  Spencer served as the head of the University of Nauvoo.  He also served as an alderman in Nauvoo.  In April 1843 Spencer was sent on a mission to New Haven, Connecticut.

Spencer was elected mayor of Nauvoo in 1845, but he appears to not have served due to the revocation of the city charter.  He would have succeeded his brother Daniel Spencer in this office.  Prior to this he served as an alderman of the city of Nauvoo.  As such he also served as a member of Nauvoo's municipal court.  After the Nauvoo Charter was revoked Spencer served as an alderman of the much smaller town of Nauvoo.

Spencer served as president of the British Mission from early 1847 until the summer of 1848. During that time he also served as editor and publisher of the Millennial Star. In 1848 he was replaced by Orson Pratt, who found that the mission had had much success under Spencer's administration.

Spencer was the president of one of the five Mormon pioneer companies in 1849. This company consisted of about 100 wagons. In 1850, when the Deseret News began publication in Salt Lake City, Spencer served as assistant editor under Willard Richards.

Spencer was a member of the first legislative council of Utah Territory.

On August 28, 1852, Brigham Young commissioned Spencer to travel, together with Jacob Houtz, to Prussia. After reaching Berlin in late January 1853, he and his companion discovered that every step they took was observed by the Prussian secret police. After only one week, at the command of Karl Otto von Raumer—Secretary of Cultural Affairs—Spencer and Houtz were forced by the police to leave Berlin without having had any visible missionary success. They were the first Mormon missionaries to preach in Germany since Orson Hyde's visit in 1841.

Spencer served as an editor and writer on many newspapers from his conversion and was named the first chancellor of the University of Deseret in 1850.

Spencer went on a mission to Cincinnati in 1854.  After being there a year he went to St. Louis where he replaced Erastus Snow as the regional church leader and editor of the St. Louis Luminary.  He shortly afterward went on a mission to the Cherokee Nation, during which he contracted malaria.  He then returned to St. Louis where he succumbed to this disease, passing away on October 15, 1855, at the age of 53.

Contributions to theology
Spencer's writings were an influential force in the formation of 19th-century Latter-day Saint theology. His statements about God the Father having a distinct place of dwelling but spreading forth his presence through the Holy Ghost were among the leading exposisitons of this Latter-day Saint view in the 1840s.

Family
Spencer's first wife was Catherine Curtis (1811-1846).  They had eight children.  He married Eliza Ann Dibble as a plural wife in January of 1846 in Nauvoo. Catherine died in March of 1846 while crossing Iowa.  While presiding over the British Mission, Spencer married Martha Knight.  He later also married Margaret Miller, Jane T. Davis and Mary Hill as plural wives.

In 1855, shortly after his death, Spencer's daughter Catherine Curtis Spencer (named after her mother) married Brigham Young, Jr.
 
Spencer was the father of Aurelia Spencer Rogers, who in 1878 founded the Primary Association, the official organization of the LDS Church for children.

Works remembered
A collection of his letters entitled Spencer's Letters was among the items placed in the capstone of the Salt Lake Temple.

References

Sources 
Spencer, Orson. (1853). The Prussian Mission of The Church of Jesus Christ of Latter-Day Saints. Report of Elder Orson Spencer, A.B., to President Brigham Young. Liverpool: S.W.Richards
Encyclopedia of Latter-day Saint Church History, p. 1173-1174.

External links 
 Utah History Encyclopedia
 Description of the correspondence between Orson Spencer and Rev. William Crowell at the BYU official website
 Conference Minutes, August 28th, 1852
 Davis Bitton: "Beguiled from Steadfastness". Notes to an Epistle of Orson Spencer to British Church members from Meridian magazine
 Hiram B. Clawson Papers at University of Utah Digital Library, Marriott Library Special Collections

1802 births
1855 deaths
19th-century American politicians
19th-century Mormon missionaries
American Latter Day Saint writers
American Mormon missionaries in Germany
American Mormon missionaries in the United Kingdom
American Mormon missionaries in the United States
American leaders of the Church of Jesus Christ of Latter-day Saints
Colgate University alumni
Converts to Mormonism from Baptist denominations
Latter Day Saints from Illinois
Latter Day Saints from Massachusetts
Latter Day Saints from New York (state)
Latter Day Saints from Utah
Members of the Utah Territorial Legislature
Mission presidents (LDS Church)
Mormon pioneers
Nauvoo, Illinois city council members
People from West Stockbridge, Massachusetts
Presidents of the University of Utah
Union College (New York) alumni
University of Utah faculty